HMM1 may refer to:

 Heroes of Might and Magic: A Strategic Quest, a video game
 2,7,4'-Trihydroxyisoflavanone 4'-O-methyltransferase, an enzyme